James Adamson is an American business man who has served as CEO of Burger King (1993–1995), CEO and Chairman of Denny's and its parent company Advantica (1993–2002), and Kmart (2002–2003).

He is noted as a turnaround specialist having helped restructure of drugstore chain Revco after its purchase by CVS Caremark in 1997. He was instrumental in restoring Denny's reputation after a series of racial incidents occurred at several of its stores during the mid-1990s. He was given the position of Kmart CEO in an attempt to swing the company's finances around in March 2002.

References 

Living people
Year of birth missing (living people)
Burger King people
Kmart
Sears Holdings people
American chief executives of food industry companies
American retail chief executives